Société Boisavia was a French manufacturer of light aircraft established by Lucien Tieles.  He began in 1946 with the B-50 Muscadet.  The firm manufactured a number of types, most significantly the Mercurey in several variants, until the mid-1960s.  Production of the Mercurey ended in 1962.

List of aircraft

 Boisavia B.50 Muscadet (1946)
 Boisavia B.60 Mercurey (1949) Single-engine four-seat high braced monoplane sport aircraft
 Boisavia B.80 Chablis (1950) Kit design for homebuilding.  Two constructed
 Boisavia B.260 Anjou (1956)

References

External links

Defunct aircraft manufacturers of France
Manufacturing companies established in 1946
1960s disestablishments
1946 establishments in France
1960s disestablishments in France